Lucas León Landa (born April 3, 1986), is an Argentine footballer, who plays as a centre-back for Mitre.

Career
Landa started his career for Gimnasia y Esgrima de La Plata in 2006. He had a loan spell at Ecuadorian Barcelona SC for the first half of 2010, but returned to Gimnasia in July.

References

External links
Lucas Landa – Argentine Primera statistics at Fútbol XXI 

1986 births
Living people
People from Caseros Department
Argentine footballers
Argentine expatriate footballers
Association football defenders
Club de Gimnasia y Esgrima La Plata footballers
Barcelona S.C. footballers
San Martín de San Juan footballers
Club Atlético Colón footballers
Guillermo Brown de Puerto Madryn footballers
Club Atlético Sarmiento footballers
Instituto footballers
Club Atlético Mitre footballers
Ecuadorian Serie A players
Argentine Primera División players
Primera Nacional players
Expatriate footballers in Ecuador
Argentine expatriate sportspeople in Ecuador
Sportspeople from Santa Fe Province